The men's shot put at the 2017 Asian Athletics Championships was held on 7 July.

Results

References

Results

Shot
Shot put at the Asian Athletics Championships